The NKVD prisoner massacres were a series of mass executions of political prisoners carried out by the NKVD, the People's Commissariat for Internal Affairs of the Soviet Union, across Eastern Europe, primarily Poland, Ukraine, the Baltic states, and Bessarabia. After the start of the German invasion of the Soviet Union on June 22, 1941, the NKVD troops were supposed to evacuate political prisoners into the interior of the Soviet Union, but the hasty retreat of the Red Army, the lack of transportation and other supplies, and the general disregard for legal procedures often meant that the prisoners were executed.

Estimates of the death toll vary between locations; nearly 9,000 in the Ukrainian SSR, 20,000–30,000 in eastern Poland (now part of Western Ukraine), with the total number reaching approximately 100,000 victims of extrajudicial executions in the span of a few weeks.

Background

The launch of Operation Barbarossa surprised the NKVD, whose jails and prisons in territories annexed by the Soviet Union in the aftermath of the Molotov–Ribbentrop Pact had been crowded with political prisoners. In occupied eastern Poland, the NKVD was given the responsibility of evacuating and liquidating over 140,000 prisoners (NKVD evacuation order No. 00803). In Ukraine and Western Belarus, 60,000 people were forced to evacuate on foot. The official Soviet count had more than 9,800 reportedly executed in the prisons, 1,443 executed in the process of evacuation, 59 killed for attempting to escape, 23 killed by German bombs and 1,057 dying from other causes.

"It was not only the numbers of the executed", the historian Yury Boshyk, who was quoted by Orest Subtelny, wrote of the murders, "but also the manner in which they died that shocked the populace. When the families of the arrested rushed to the prisons after the Soviet evacuation, they were aghast to find bodies so badly mutilated that many could not be identified. It was evident that many of the prisoners had also been tortured before death; others were killed en masse".

Approximately two thirds of the 150,000 prisoners were murdered; most of the rest were transported into the interior of the Soviet Union, but some were abandoned in the prisons if there was no time to execute them, and others managed to escape.

Massacres
The NKVD killed prisoners in many places from Poland to Crimea. Immediately after the start of the German invasion, the NKVD started to execute large numbers of prisoners in most of their prisons, and it evacuated the remainder in death marches.<ref name="PWN"> Encyklopedia PWN, Zbrodnie Sowickie W Polsce : After the outbreak of the German-Soviet war, in June 1941, thousands of prisoners have been murdered in mass executions in prisons (among others in Lviv and Berezwecz) and during the evacuation (so-called death marches)</ref> Most of them were political prisoners, who were imprisoned and executed without a trial. The massacres were later documented by the occupying German authorities and were used in anti-Soviet and anti-Jewish propaganda. After the war and in recent years, the authorities of Germany, Poland, Belarus and Israel identified no fewer than 25 prisons whose prisoners were killed and a much larger number of mass execution sites.

Belarus
 Chervyen massacre near Minsk: in late June, the NKVD started the evacuation of all prisons in Minsk. Between June 24 and June 27, at least 1,000 people were killed in Chervyen and during the death marches.
 Hlybokaye (Głębokie in pre-war Poland), near Vitebsk: on June 24, the NKVD executed approximately 800 prisoners, most of them Polish citizens. Several thousands more perished during a death march to Nikolaevo near Ulla.
 Hrodna (Grodno in pre-war Poland): on June 22, 1941, the NKVD executed several dozen people at the local prison. The mass execution of the remaining 1,700 prisoners was not possible due to the advance of the German army and hurried retreat of the NKVD executioners.
 Vileyka (Wilejka in pre-war Poland): several dozen people, mostly political prisoners, sick, and wounded, were executed prior to the departure of the Soviet guards on June 24, 1941.

Estonia

 Tartu massacre: on July 9, 1941, 193 detainees were shot in Tartu prison and the Gray House courtyard; their bodies were dumped in makeshift graves and in the prison well.

Lithuania
 Vilnius (Wilno in pre-war Poland): after the German invasion, the NKVD murdered a large number of prisoners of the infamous Lukiškės Prison.
 Rainiai massacre near Telšiai: up to 79 political prisoners were killed on June 24 and the following day.
 Pravieniškės prison near Kaunas: in June 1941, the NKVD murdered 260 political prisoners and all Lithuanian working personnel in the prison.
 Lithuanian prisoners were evacuated to Belarus and some of them were murdered, e.g., in the Chervyen massacre and near Bigosovo.

Poland

 
By 1941, a large portion of the ethnically Polish population living under Soviet rule in the eastern half of Poland had already been deported to remote areas of the USSR. Others, including a large number of Polish civilians of other ethnicities (mostly Belarusians and Ukrainians), were held in provisional prisons in the towns of the region, where they awaited deportation either to NKVD prisons in Moscow or to the Gulag. It is estimated that out of 13 million people living in eastern Poland, roughly half a million were jailed, and more than 90% of those were men. Thus approximately 10% of adult males were imprisoned at the time of the German offensive. Many died in prisons from torture or neglect. Methods of torture included scalding victims in boiling water and cutting off ears, noses and fingers. Timothy Snyder estimates that the NKVD shot some 9,817 imprisoned Polish citizens following the German invasion of the USSR in 1941.
 NKVD massacre sites in pre-war Poland are now in Lithuania, Belarus and Ukraine.

Ukraine

In occupied by Soviets Western parts of Ukrainie under threat of German invasion NKVD has committed various mass-murdes of prison inmates, these include:
 Berezhany (Brzeżany in pre-war Poland) near Ternopil (Tarnopol): between June 22 and July 1 the crew of the local NKVD prison executed approximately 300 Polish citizens, among them a large number of Ukrainians.
 Donetsk Rutchenkovo Field
 Dubno (in pre-war Poland): All the prisoners in Dubno's three-story prison, including women and children, were executed.
 Ivano-Frankivsk (Stanisławów in pre-war Poland): Over 500 Polish prisoners (including 150 women with dozens of children) were shot by the NKVD and buried in several mass graves at Dem'ianiv Laz.
 Kharkiv tragedy: 1,200 prisoners were burned alive.
 Lutsk (Łuck in pre-war Poland): After the prison was hit by German bombs, the Soviet authorities promised amnesty to all political prisoners, in order to prevent escapes. As they lined up outside they were machine-gunned by Soviet tanks. They were told: "Those still alive get up." Some 370 stood up and were forced to bury the dead, after which they were murdered as well. The Nazi foreign ministry claimed 1,500 Ukrainians were killed while the SS and Nazi military intelligence claimed 4,000.
 Lviv (Lwów in pre-war Poland): the massacres in this city began immediately after German attack, on June 22 and continued until June 28. The NKVD executed several thousand inmates in a number of provisional prisons. Among the common methods of extermination were shooting the prisoners in their cells, killing them with grenades thrown into the cells or starving them to death in the cellars. Some were simply bayoneted to death. It is estimated that over 4000 people were murdered that way, while the number of survivors is estimated at approximately 270. A Ukrainian uprising briefly forced the NKVD to retreat, but it soon returned to kill the remaining prisoners in their cells. In the aftermath, medical students described the scene at one of the prisons:
 "From the courtyard, doors led to a large space, filled from top to bottom with corpses. The bottom ones were still warm. The victims were between 15 and 60 years old, but most were 20-35 years old. They laid in various poses, with open eyes and masks of terror on their faces. Among them were many women. On the left wall, three men were crucified, barely covered by clothing from their shoulders, with severed male organs. Underneath them on the floor in half-sitting, leaning positions – two nuns with those organs in their mouths. The victims of the NKVD's sadism were killed with a shot in the mouth or the back of the head. But most were stabbed in the stomach with a bayonet. Some were naked or almost naked, others in decent street clothes. One man was in a tie, mostly likely just arrested."These massacres were immediately followed by the Lviv pogroms, which were committed by the German military and the Organization of Ukrainian Nationalists, after the German takeover of the city. Jewish residents of the city were targeted by German soldiers, OUN members, and local citizens. In some instances, the pogroms and violence against Jewish residents was framed as justified revenge for the murders committed by the NKVD.
 Sambir (Sambor in pre-war Poland): 570 killed.
 Simferopol: on October 31, the NKVD shot a number of people in the NKVD building and in the city prison.
 Yalta: on November 4, the NKVD shot all the prisoners in the city prisons.

Soviet statistics for 78 Ukrainian prisons:
 evacuated 45,569 
 killed inside the prisons 8,789
 killed runaways 48 
 killed legally 123
 killed illegally 55
 left alive 3,536

Russia
 Oryol: In September 1941, over 150 political prisoners (among them Christian Rakovsky, Maria Spiridonova, Olga Kameneva and Dmitri Pletnyov) were executed in Medvedevsky Forest near Oryol.
 Kuybyshev: On 28 October 1941, 20 high ranking ex-Red Army officers and party officials were shot without trial in the village of Barbysh, Kuybyshev.

See also

 Bykivnia Graves
 List of World War II prisoner-of-war camps in the Soviet Union
 Mass graves in the Soviet Union
 Mass killings under communist regimes
 Monument to the Fallen and Murdered in the East
 Polish prisoners-of-war in the Soviet Union after 1939
 Territories of Poland annexed by the Soviet Union
 Soviet repressions of Polish citizens (1939–1946)
 World War II crimes in Poland

References

Further reading
Bogdan Musical Konterrevolutionäre Elemente sind zu erschießen. Die Brutalisierung des deutsch-sowjetischen Krieges im Sommer 1941'' Berlin Propyläen Verlag 349 S. 2000

External links

1941 in the Soviet Union
Massacres in 1941
Prisoner Massacres
Soviet World War II crimes
Belarus in World War II
Ukraine in World War II
Massacres in Belarus
Massacres in Poland
Massacres in Russia
Massacres in Ukraine
Massacres in Estonia
Massacres in Latvia
Massacres in Lithuania
Occupation of the Baltic states
Soviet occupation of Eastern Poland 1939–1941
Soviet occupation of Bessarabia and Northern Bukovina
People executed by the Soviet Union
Political repression in the Soviet Union
Mass murder in 1941
Massacres in the Soviet Union